Massimo D'Amico (born 1979, Vietri sul Mare, Salerno) is an Italian artist working in the Czech Republic.

Biography 
D'Amico was born in Vietri sul Mare on Amalfi Coast, and lives and works in Prague. After a self-taught apprenticeship that lasted throughout his teens, he took courses in painting at the Naples Academy of Fine Arts. Around twenty-three years decides to leave the Southern Italy, to have a broader contact with the international art scene, and follows different routes, including: Barcelona, London, and then went to New York City, where he joined in 2006 in the large group of emerging artists, actors and musicians, that find themselves living in the new Brooklyn, as Williamsburg and Green Point, but looking for areas of visibility, collaboration and records in Manhattan. He now exhibits for the gallery Monkdogz Urban Art in Chelsea on 27th Street.

Style 
His style is a combination of semi-abstract and expressionist art, and is hard to categorize. His images are mostly structures and machines, "capable of collecting energy and matter."

References

External links
Massimo D'Amico official site .
Italian Newspaper .
Monkdogz Gallery Visual Artist's Link.
Saatchi Online Gallery Massimo Damico.
Tom of Finland foundation Events Foreplay.
infantellina contemporary ,
Denik.cz .
artfacts.net .
Wannicek Gallery 
CrissCross 
Městská Knihovna v Praze 
Artadoo 
The Eckleburg Gallery 
2021 Interview with Massimo Damico on YouTube 

20th-century Italian painters
Italian male painters
21st-century Italian painters
1979 births
Living people
People from the Province of Salerno
Artists from Prague
20th-century Italian male artists
21st-century Italian male artists